Pupinella frednaggsi is a species of pulmonate gastropod in the family Pupinidae from the regions surrounding Luang Phrabang, in Central Laos.

This species is known only from the type locality, in Tam Phatok Cave, Ngoy District, Luang Phrabang Province.

References

frednaggsi
Gastropods described in 2017